The Wound Medal was a decoration of the Empire of Austria-Hungary. It was established on August 12, 1917, by Emperor Karl and was the last medal to be officially founded in the empire.

The Wound Medal was awarded to service members of the Austro-Hungarian armed forces and to persons attached to the Austro-Hungarian armed forces who were wounded as a result of combat operations.  Besides wounded persons, it was also awarded to persons who were disabled or suffered serious damage to their health in connection with military actions.

Description

The medal was made of zinc, and measured 38-mm in diameter.  The zinc surface was dull gray, but examples with a polished surface often appear.

The obverse of the medal featured a bust of Emperor Karl with his name in Latin "CAROLUS" above and a wreath of laurels below.  Between the bust and the laurels in smaller letters was the name of the designer of the medal, R.(Richard) PLACHT, 1880 Kratzau - 1962 Vienna. The reverse featured the words LAESO MILITI ("to the wounded soldier") and the date in Roman numerals "MCMXVIII" (1918).

The medal was suspended from a typical Austrian-style trifold ribbon, 39-mm in width.  The ribbon was gray-green with 4-mm wide red edge stripes.  The number of wounds was indicated by narrower 2-mm wide red stripes, edged in black, centered on the ribbon.  No stripes indicated an award for someone invalided out of service.  One stripe indicated a single wound, two stripes two wounds, etc.

References

 Václav Měřička, Orden und Ehrenzeichen der Österreichisch-Ungarischen Monarchie (1974)
 Johann Stolzer and Christian Steeb, eds., Österreichs Orden vom Mittelalter bis zur Gegenwart (1996)
 Arthur H. Houston, Vicken Koundakjian, Wound Medals, Insignia and Next-Of-Kin Awards of The Great War, OMSA 1995
 Discussion and examples of Austro-Hungarian Wound Medals at the Gentleman's Military Interest Club project forum for Wound Awards & Decorations of the World.

Military awards and decorations of Austria-Hungary
Wound decorations
Awards established in 1917
1917 establishments in Austria-Hungary
Military awards and decorations of World War I